Calamotropha argenteociliella is a moth in the family Crambidae. It was described by Arnold Pagenstecher in 1893. It is found in Mozambique.

References

Crambinae
Moths described in 1893